Uncork Capital (formerly known as SoftTech VC) is a venture capital firm based in San Francisco, California, founded by Jeff Clavier. Considered one of the most active established seed funds in Silicon Valley, it has invested in companies such as Postmates, Eventbrite, Fitbit, and SendGrid.

History
The firm was founded in 2004 by angel investor Jeff Clavier when he transitioned his portfolio into a formal venture firm. Partners include Andy McLoughlin (formerly of Huddle), Susan Liu (formerly of Scale Venture Partners) and Tripp Jones (formerly of August Capital). As of 2022, the firm had invested in over 240 early stage start-ups.

In 2017, the firm changed its name from SoftTech VC to Uncork Capital.

Investments

The firm primarily invests in SaaS (software as a service), marketplaces, consumer services and "frontier technology" ventures. With a focus on seed-stage funding, the firm generally aims to secure between 8-12% ownership of the companies it invests in.

The firm's first fund raised less than $1 million, while the second fund raised $15 million in 2007. 

In 2012, Fund III oversubscribed at $55 million, and, in 2014, they closed their fourth fund at $85 million, bringing their capital under management to $155 million. 

In 2016, the firm raised $100 million for SoftTechVC V and $50 million for a breakout fund. In 2019, the firm raised $100M for Uncork VI and $100 for their second breakout find, Plus II.

Notable investments have included: Eventbrite, Fitbit, Postmates, SendGrid, Survata, Gnip, BrightRoll, Vidyard, LiveRamp, about.me, August Home, Bitly, Bleacher Report, Blekko, Chariot, Curse LLC, Gnip, Handshake, Kongregate, Mint.com, and Next Big Sound.

References

External links
 

Venture capital firms of the United States
Private equity firms of the United States
Companies based in Palo Alto, California
Financial services companies established in 2004